Osvaldo Ramous (Fiume, 11.10.1905 - Rijeka, March 1981) was a   prominent Fiuman  writer from the city of Rijeka (the former city-state of  Fiume, then a part of Italy), who wrote in the  Italian language. His diverse works include poetry, prose, drama, essayist prose, criticism, journalism, culture organization, editorial work, translation, and he was also a director of cultural institutions.

Biography

Born in 1905 in the Old Town (Zitavecia) of Rijeka, son of Marie Giacich and Adolf Ramous, he was soon left without his father, and his mother with her six children moved to the hilly suburb of Belveder. His uncle Nazio took care of the children and discovered Osvaldo's musical and literary talents. The boy attended academic studies and music school in  parallel (studying ten years of piano and violin in the class of Professor Malvin). Ramous then worked as a journalist, employed as a literary and music critic of the Fiume-based daily  La Vedetta d'Italia , and in 1923 and 1924 collaborateds with the cultural magazines  Delta  and Fiumanella .

In 1936 he marrieds Matilde Meštrović, niece  of the Croatian sculptor Ivan Meštrović. In 1938 he published his first collection of poems under the title  :Nel canneto" in the magazine  Termini, which received a special recognition from the Royal Academy of Italy.  World War II had a heavy toll on Fiume both militarily and culturally. In 1942, although he was editor-in-chief, he was dismissed because of a 'reduction in the number of employees', an excuse for being    insufficiently fascist . Two years later, during the German occupation, he accepted to the position of chief of that paper,  as the  city authorities needed to appoint   a more neutral intellectual. At the same time, he collaborated with the Partisans. The Germans did not trust him, and the Gestapo subjects him to torture in the summer of 1944.

After the war, he becomes a member of the National Theater Administration in Rijeka, which was now a part of Yugoslavia. This was the new name the Yugoslav authorities give to Fiume (a direct translation of the name into Croatian), and   became the director of the Italian theatre there  until his retirement in 1961. He was intensely involved in translation work, especially songs from French, Spanish and South Slavic languages. Ramous remained in his town, where he begins to weave a network of cultural links in the area of deeply marked political events. He chooses and translates the songs and prose of the South Slavic authors, getting acquainted with readers of prominent Italian magazines. He edits and translates the first anthology of contemporary Yugoslav poets called "Poesia Jugoslava Contemporanea". This anthology was published in 1959 (six years before the establishment of political and cultural relations between Italy and Yugoslavia), and includes 55 poets (Croats, Serbs, Slovenes and Macedonians). In addition to these songs, he also translated the dramas of Branislav Nušić ("Dr and Pokojnik"), Ivo Vojnović ("Ekvinocija"), Mirko Božić ("Ljuljačka u tuznoj vrbi") and Draga Ivaniševića ( Ljubav u koroti ).

In 1951 he married Nevenka Malić, head of the Children's Theater in Rijeka. As a regular collaborator of the local radio, Television and Radio Koper in Italian, he sent his translations of Nušić, Andrić, Krleža and thus contributes to the knowledge and spread of cultures of different peoples and to the cultural mediation in this border lands. Thanks to Osvaldo Ramous, Rijeka, Ljubljana, Zagreb, Belgrade, Sarajevo and Koper guest the "Piccolo Teatro" of Milan, with the performance of Carlo Goldoni's, "Arlecchino servitore di due padroni". He also organised a  Congress of Italian and Croatian writers in Cittadella in 1964, in a period when Yugoslav relations to Italy have not yet been solved, so communication is considerably hampered. Many problems arise, and there are various tries to sabotage the cultural happening. Unpublished documents of the Association of Yugoslav Writers testifies to an invitation to Croatian, Serbian, Bosnian and Slovene writers not to attend this Congress. Ramous managed to overcome this barrier and the gathering was held without any successful external political influence.

In addition to collections of songs, he published novels, stories, essays, dramas and radio plays. As a poet, Ramous belongs to the lyricists, intimates, sensitivists and descriptuals. His lyrical verses are often devoted to the unstoppable nature of time and passage of life. Modern criticism has recognised the features of a restrained modernism in them. For his works Ramous was awarded many awards. In addition to the aforementioned distinction, he also received the Premio Cittadella (Gold Medal) in 1955 for the "Vento sullo stagno" collection, and the Premio Cervia in 1963 for the collection of Risveglio di Medea, a Gold Medal for the novel L'ora di Minutopoli. In 1965, he was awarded the City of Rijeka Award for the collection "Vento sullo stagno" and the novel "Galebovi na krovu".
He died in Rijeka in 1981.

Main works
Poetic collections
 Nel canneto, 1938.
 Vento sullo stagno, 1953.
 Pianto vegetale, 1960.
 Il vino della notte, 1964.
 Risveglio di Medea, 1967.
 Realtà dell'assurdo, 1973.
 Pietà delle cose, 1977.
 Viaggio quotidiano, 1982.

Novels
 I gabbiani sul tetto, („Galebovi na krovu“) 1964.
 Serenata alla morte, 1965.
 Il cavallo di cartapesta („Kaširani konj“), 2007.

Dramas and comedies
 Un duello, 1935.
 Edizione straordinaria, 1951.
 Lotta con l'ombra, 1959.
 La mia ocarina, 1961.
 Il farmaco portentoso, 1963.
 Con un piede nell'acqua, 1969.
 Un cuore quasi umano, 1970.
 Guido, i' vorrei che tu, Lapo ed io..., 1972.
 Un attimo solo, 1974.
 Le pecore e il mostro, 1976.
 Viaggio senza meta, 1976.
 Sull'onda degli echi, 1977.

References

1905 births
1981 deaths
Croatian male writers
Writers from Rijeka